Dallas City Township is one of twenty-five townships in Hancock County, Illinois, USA.  As of the 2010 census, its population was 996 and it contained 502 housing units.  It was formed from Pontoosuc Township in 1860.

Geography

Cities, towns, villages
 Dallas City (south half)

Unincorporated towns
 Colusa at 
(This list is based on USGS data and may include former settlements.)

Cemeteries
The township contains Harris Cemetery.

Major highways
  Illinois Route 9
  Illinois Route 96

Demographics

School districts
 Nauvoo-Colusa Community Unit School District 325

Political districts
 Illinois's 17th congressional district
 State House District 94
 State Senate District 47

References
 United States Census Bureau 2008 TIGER/Line Shapefiles
 
 United States National Atlas

External links
 City-Data.com
 Illinois State Archives
 Township Officials of Illinois

Townships in Hancock County, Illinois
Townships in Illinois